Peter Mortimer (born 22 December 1957) is an Australian former professional rugby league footballer who played in the 1970s and 1980s. He played for the Canterbury-Bankstown Bulldogs and New South Wales.

Background
Peter Mortimer was born in Yagoona, a suburb of Sydney, the second of the three brothers to play for Canterbury during the late 1970s, and 1980s. Glen Mortimer the 4th brother played 27 first grade games for Cronulla between 1983-87 after starting out in the Bulldogs lower grades. The brothers were all raised in the Riverina city of Wagga Wagga, New South Wales.

His son, Daniel, made his NRL début in 2009 for the Parramatta Eels, continuing the family tradition.

Playing career

Mortimer played 190 first grade games for Canterbury between 1977–87, and is equal fourth on the all-time try-scoring list alongside older brother Steve. He was a member of the Canterbury Premiership winning teams in 1980, 1984 and 1985 and played in Canterbury's Grand Final loss in 1979.

Mortimer scored a try in Canterbury's 1979 Grand Final loss against St George and was their only try-scorer in the 1985 triumph against St George. He also had a try disallowed in the 1984 success against Parramatta.

Mortimer represented New South Wales in 1979 and was unlucky not to play State of Origin and narrowly missed selection for the 1982 Kangaroo Tour. Even though Steve and Chris played for Australia Peter enjoyed a fine career at Canterbury as a winger or centre and was a popular and respected player amongst his teammates and opponents.

Peter Mortimer, his older brother Steve Mortimer and younger brother Chris Mortimer played in four Grand Finals together. Peter was a non-playing reserve in 1986 due to injury and only Steve was around when the 1988 Grand Final was played. No pair of brothers, yet alone trio of brothers have played in four Grand Finals in the last 30 years. All three Mortimer brothers are Life Members of the Canterbury-Bankstown Bulldogs Football Club.

Post playing
Mortimer became Canterbury Marketing Manager in 1987 during his final season and continued in that position until 1991. He had a short period as Cronulla Chief Executive Officer in 1992. He returned to Canterbury in 2002 following the salary cap scandal where he took up a position as Football Club Director with brother Steve as Chief Executive. Peter Mortimer resigned as Football Club Director in 2004 not long after Steve Mortimer was forced out of his position.

He worked as a news reporter in Orange and is working in the wine business.

See also
Mortimer family

References

1957 births
Living people
Australian rugby league players
Canterbury-Bankstown Bulldogs players
Hull Kingston Rovers players
Peter
Rugby league players from Wagga Wagga
Rugby league wingers